COVID-19 vaccination in Nigeria is an ongoing immunization campaign against severe acute respiratory syndrome coronavirus 2 (SARS-CoV-2), the virus that causes coronavirus disease 2019 (COVID-19), in response to the ongoing pandemic in the country. Vaccination began on 5 March 2021. As of 28 February 2022, 17,914,944 people have received their first dose a COVID-19 vaccine, and 8,197,832 have received their second dose.

History

Timeline

March 2021
On 2 March, the first shipment of four million Oxford–AstraZeneca COVID-19 vaccine doses from the COVAX initiative arrived at Nnamdi Azikiwe International Airport.

Cyprian Ngong, a doctor at National Hospital, Abuja, became the first person in Nigeria to receive a COVID-19 vaccine on 5 March.

President Muhammadu Buhari received his first COVID-19 vaccine dose on 6 March.

On 21 March, Nigeria received an additional 300,000 doses of Oxford–AstraZeneca COVID-19 vaccines from MTN.

By the end of March, 0.7 million vaccine doses had been administered.

April 2021
On 6 April, Nigeria received 100,000 doses of Oxford–AstraZeneca COVID-19 vaccines from the Government of India.

By the end of April, 1.2 million vaccine doses had been administered.

May 2021
By the end of May, 1.6 million vaccine doses had been administered.

June 2021
By the end of June, 3.4 million vaccine doses had been administered.

July 2021
The vaccination campaign in Nigeria was paused on 9 July due to exhaustion of the first COVAX shipment that arrived in March.

By the end of July, 3.9 million vaccine doses had been administered.

August 2021
On 1 August, Nigeria received four million doses of Moderna COVID-19 vaccines from the United States.

The second phase of the vaccination rollout began on 16 August.

By the end of August, 4.2 million vaccine doses had been administered.

September 2021
By the end of September, 6.9 million vaccine doses had been administered.

October 2021
On 8 October, Nigeria received 500,000 doses of Oxford–AstraZeneca COVID-19 vaccines from the Government of France.

By the end of October, 8.6 million vaccine doses had been administered. 4% of the target population had been fully vaccinated by the end of the month.

November 2021
By the end of November, 9.8 million vaccine doses had been administered. 4% of the target population had been fully vaccinated by the end of the month.

December 2021
Up to a million doses of the Oxford-AstraZeneca vaccine were destroyed by Nigeria due to their short expiry dates.

By the end of December, 14.8 million vaccine doses had been administered. 5% of the target population had been fully vaccinated by the end of the month.

January 2022
By the end of January, 20.6 million vaccine doses had been administered. 6% of the target population had been fully vaccinated by the end of the month.

February 2022
By the end of February, 26.5 million vaccine doses had been administered and 8.1 million persons had been fully vaccinated.

March 2022
By the end of March, 31.4 million vaccine doses had been administered and 9.6 million persons had been fully vaccinated.

April 2022
By the end of April, 38.4 million vaccine doses had been administered and 14.9 million persons had been fully vaccinated.

Vaccines on order

Rollout schedule

Statistics

By state
Proportion vaccinated (1st dose)

Proportion vaccinated (2nd dose)

See also
 COVID-19 vaccination in Africa

Notes

References

Nigeria
COVID-19 pandemic in Nigeria
Nigeria
2021 in Nigeria
2020 in Nigeria